Thomas Whipple Jr. (1787 – January 23, 1835) was a U.S. Representative from New Hampshire.

Born in Lebanon, New Hampshire, Whipple completed preparatory studies before moving to Warren, New Hampshire in 1811. He studied medicine in Haverhill and Hanover, New Hampshire, graduating from Dartmouth College in 1814. He commenced practice in Wentworth and served as member of the New Hampshire House of Representatives between 1818–1820.

Whipple was elected to the Seventeenth and the three succeeding Congresses (March 4, 1821 – March 3, 1829). After his time in office he resumed the practice of medicine and died in Wentworth, New Hampshire on January 23, 1835. He was interred in Wentworth Village Cemetery.

References

1787 births
1835 deaths
Members of the New Hampshire House of Representatives
Dartmouth College alumni
Democratic-Republican Party members of the United States House of Representatives from New Hampshire
National Republican Party members of the United States House of Representatives
New Hampshire National Republicans
19th-century American politicians
People from Lebanon, New Hampshire
People from Warren, New Hampshire